Cariz Point (Agrelo Point) is the rocky north extremity of Nelson Island in the South Shetland Islands, Antarctica. British mapping of the area in 1968.

Maps
 Livingston Island to King George Island.  Scale 1:200000.  Admiralty Nautical Chart 1776. Taunton: UK Hydrographic Office, 1968
 South Shetland Islands. Scale 1:200000 topographic map No. 3373. DOS 610 - W 62 58. Tolworth, UK, 1968
 Antarctic Digital Database (ADD). Scale 1:250000 topographic map of Antarctica. Scientific Committee on Antarctic Research (SCAR). Since 1993, regularly upgraded and updated

References

 Cabo Cariz. Composite Antarctic Gazetteer
 Cabo Agrelo. Composite Antarctic Gazetteer

External links
 Cariz (Agrelo) Point. Copernix satellite image

Headlands of the South Shetland Islands